Dwaun J. Warmack (born ), is an American university administrator and university president. Since 2019, he serves as the 9th President of Claflin University, a historically black university in Orangeburg, South Carolina. He previously served as the 19th President of Harris–Stowe State University in St. Louis, Missouri.

Education 
Warmack attended Jared W. Finney High School in Detroit, Michigan. He was the first generation to go to college.

He graduated from Delta State University with a bachelor's degree in education and master's degree in sociology. He received his doctorate in educational leadership with a specialization in higher education from Union University in Jackson, Tennessee. He completed his post-doctoral studies in educational leadership at Harvard University School of Education.

Career 
In 1999, his work in higher education began at his alma mater, Delta State University, as coordinator of student development and activities and as a financial aid counselor until 2002. He was then promoted to director of multicultural affairs and multicultural center. 

He worked at Western Carolina University (WCU), as an associate director of the University Center and director of programs, prior to joining Rhodes. In July 2005, he began at Rhodes College in Memphis, Tennessee, as associate dean of students; where he founded the Western North Carolina Minority Networking Program. From 2010 until 2014, he served as vice president for enrollment management and student affairs and as senior vice president of administration and student services at Bethune-Cookman University.

Warmack was inaugurated as the 19th president of Harris-Stowe State University on July 14, 2014, succeeding Albert Walker. One of his goals: bring Harris-Stowe into the league of premier universities in the Midwest. His efforts resulted in a 25 percent increase in enrollment the following year, approximately 9 million dollars in external funding and, for the first time in the school's history, the passing of Senate Bill 334 which allows the university to grant master's degrees.

He has more than 20 years of progressive administrative experience in higher education at five distinct higher education institutions to the position. He is a scholar-practitioner and possesses a wealth of experience in program design, faculty and student development, assessment and accreditation. Since assuming the presidency of Harris-Stowe in 2014, Warmack has aggressively and strategically implemented programs and strategies which have resulted in significant increases in enrollment, retention and graduation rates.

Warmack has participated in a variety of professional development opportunities including the American Association of State Colleges and Universities’ (AASCU), Millennium Leadership Initiative (MLI), and Hampton University’s “On The Road to the Presidency: Executive Leadership Summit.” His time at ended July 31, 2019.

On August 1, 2019, Warmack began his tenure as the ninth president of Claflin University, succeeding Henry N. Tisdale.

Affiliations, honors and awards 
In 2000 Warmack was inducted into Omicron Delta Kappa as a faculty/staff member at Delta State University.

He has appeared on CNN, Al Jazeera America, C-SPAN and NPR discussing educational issues that impact the nation. He currently serves on the boards of Cortex, the Saint Louis Science Center, the St. Louis Regional Chamber, The Muny, the Grand Center and the United Way of Greater St. Louis, and Greater St. Louis Area Council Boy Scouts of America.

Warmack is a peer reviewer with the Higher Learning Commission, the largest regional accreditation body in the United States.

Warmack was also selected as a 2019 Eisenhower Fellow. He was one out of 13 U.S. leaders selected and the only one from an academic institution. His research was centered on finding the best practices for reducing mass incarceration through education and rehabilitation.

St. Louis Business Journal "Diverse Business Leader Honoree"
St. Louis American "Salute to Excellence" Young Leader Award
Who's Who in Color "Most Intriguing People of 2015"
St. Louis Business Journal '40 Under 40' Recipient
Delux Magazine Feature Cover
East St. Louis Branch of NAACP, "Game Changer" Award Recipient
Delta State University, Hall of Fame
Delux Power 100 “Trailblazer Award” Recipient, December, 2017

References 

Delta State University alumni
Union University alumni
Year of birth missing (living people)
Living people
Western Carolina University people
Bethune–Cookman University people
Harris–Stowe State University faculty
Claflin University faculty